Cyclobacterium lianum  is a horseshoe-shaped, heterotrophic, aerobic and non-motile bacterium from the genus of Cyclobacterium which has been isolated from sediments from the Xijiang oilfield of the South China Sea in China.

References 

Cytophagia
Bacteria described in 2006